The Secretary of Health and Human Services of Massachusetts is the head of the Massachusetts Executive Office of Health and Human Services, and serves as an advisor to the Governor of Massachusetts. Its current Secretary is Marylou Sudders, who has been serving since January 8, 2015.

Duties 
It oversees 12 agencies and MassHealth, with a combined budget of US$24 billion and 22,000 public employees, as of 2021.

Agencies 
Department of Children & Families
Department of Developmental Services
Department of Elder Affairs
Department of Mental Health
Department of Public Health
Department of Transitional Assistance
Department of Veterans' Services
Department of Youth Services
Massachusetts Commission for the Blind
Massachusetts Commission for the Deaf & Hard of Hearing
Massachusetts Rehabilitation Commission
MassHealth
Office of Diversity, Equal Opportunity and Civil Rights
Office of Human Resources
Office for Refugees & Immigrants
Soldiers' Home in Chelsea
Soldiers' Home in Holyoke

References